Gouin or Goüin may refer to:

Places
 Barrage Gouin Water Aerodrome, airport in Quebec
 Gouin-Gouin, town in Burkina Faso
 Gouin (electoral district), provincial electoral district
 Gouin Boulevard, longest street on the island of Montreal
 Gouin Reservoir, lake in Quebec
 Pointe du Grand Gouin, promontory

Other uses
 Gouin (surname)
 69 Gouin, bus route in Montreal
 Hôtel Goüin, hôtel particulier in Tours
 Gouin Street Arena, former sports complex in Sault Ste. Marie, Ontario